Baga may refer to:

People
 Baga (king) (3rd century BC), a king of ancient Mauretania
 Ena Baga (1906–2004), English pianist
 Kiri Baga (born 1995), American figure skater
 Rita Baga, Canadian drag queen
 Baga Chipz, stage name of Leo Loren, British drag queen

Places

 Baga, Bhola, Bangladesh
 Baga, Patuakhali, Bangladesh
 Baga, Borno
 Baga, Goa, India
 Baga Creek, a tidal estuary in Baga
 Bagà, Catalonia, Spain
 Baga, Mainling County, Tibet
 Baga, Doufelgou, Togo
 Baga, Togo
 , Tibet, whose transcription from Chinese is Baga
 Mount Baga, Australia
 Another name for Mbava in Solomon Islands

Other uses
 Baga (grape), a Portuguese wine grape variety
 Baga (novel), by Robert Pinget
 Baga Beach (film), 2013 Konkani-English film
 Bagå Formation, on the island of Bornholm, Denmark
 Baga people, of Guinea
 Baga language
 British Amateur Gymnastics Association
 A synonym for the Portuguese wine grape Alicante Bouschet

See also
 Baga de Secretis, a former English store of secret documents
 Bagas (disambiguation)
 Bagga
 Bhaga, an Indo-Iranian word for lord or patron

Language and nationality disambiguation pages